Epacris petrophila, commonly known as snow heath, is a species of flowering plant from the heath family, Ericaceae, and is endemic to south-eastern Australia. It is an erect, bushy, sometimes low-lying shrub with egg-shaped to elliptic leaves and tube-shaped white flowers in small clusters on the ends of branches.

Description

Taxonomy
Epacris petrophila was first formally described in 1857 by Joseph Dalton Hooker in The botany of the Antarctic voyage of H.M. Discovery ships Erebus and Terror. III. Flora Tasmaniae from specimens collected by Ronald Campbell Gunn. The specific epithet (petrophila) means "rock-loving".

Distribution and habitat
Snow heath grows in the alpine and subalpine feldmark, heath and bog in New South Wales and the Australian Capital Territory south from Mount Kosciuszko, in a few locations in Victoria and in Tasmania where it is common on the Central Plateau.

Ecology

The seed of Epacris petrophila was featured on the $1 postage stamp issued on 8 October 2019 by Australia Post.  The stamp issue was one of three stamps, each featuring the seeds of threatened Australian plant species, recognising the work of the Australian Seed Bank Partnership.

References

Ericales of Australia
petrophila
Flora of New South Wales
Flora of Victoria (Australia)
Flora of Tasmania
Flora of the Australian Capital Territory
Taxa named by Joseph Dalton Hooker
Plants described in 1857